Agrate Conturbia (Piedmontese: Agrà e Contòrbia, Lombard: Agraa e Contorbia) is a comune (municipality) in the Province of Novara, in the Italian region of Piedmont, located about  northeast of Turin and about  north of Novara. It consists of two towns, Agrate and Conturbia, located in the low hills between Cressa and Borgo Ticino, south of Lake Maggiore.

Agrate Conturbia borders the following municipalities: Bogogno, Borgo Ticino, Divignano, Gattico-Veruno, Mezzomerico and Suno.

Main sights
Castle of Agrate, of which few original parts remain after it was damaged in 1400
Castle of Conturbia, also modified
Parish church of San Vittore, documented as early as 978
Baptistry of Agrate, in Romanesque style. It is dedicated to St. John the Baptist. The lower section (based over a Roman edifice) dates to about 930, while the upper one is from about 1120. It has an octagonal plan, with a small portal surmounted by a single mullioned window. Further triple, blind mullioned windows decorate each face of the building, as well as Lombard bands. The interior has some 15th-century frescoes.
Faunistic Park La Torbiera, a zoo built in 1977

References

External links
 Official website

Cities and towns in Piedmont